Prasuti (प्रसूति, Prasūti) is the consort of Daksha and mother of many daughters by him, including the goddess Sati. Prasuti is the daughter of Svayambhuva Manu and Shatarupa.

Marriage and children
Marriage of Daksha and Prasūti was the first marriage in Hinduism. According to Vishnu Purana, Linga Purana and Padma Purana, Daksha and his wife Prasuti had many daughters (the numbers vary from 16 to 60, but most scholars consider it 24  Sraddha, Bhakti, Dhriti, Thushti, Pushti, Medha, Kriya, Buddhika, Lajja Gauri, Vapu, Santi,Aditi, diti, rohini, revati, Vijaya ,Siddhika, Kirtti, Khyati, Sambhuti, Smriti, Priti, Kshama, Sannati, Urjja, Swaha, Swadha and Sati. The Padma Purana records that Daksha felt that 24 daughters were not enough and produced more 60 maidens, though these sixty daughters are mentioned as the offsprings of Asikni in other texts.

References

Hindu goddesses
Indian queen consorts